Ella Josephine Wilson (born 17 November 2003) is an Australian cricketer who currently plays for South Australia in the Women's National Cricket League (WNCL) and Adelaide Strikers in the Women's Big Bash League (WBBL). She plays as a right-arm medium bowler and right-handed batter.

Domestic career
Wilson plays grade cricket for Glenelg Cricket Club. In May 2022, Wilson received her first contract, signing with South Australia for the upcoming WNCL season. In September 2022, she was signed by Adelaide Strikers for the 2022–23 Women's Big Bash League, although she did not play a match for the side that season. In February 2023, Wilson made her debut for South Australia, against Queensland in the WNCL, taking 1/27 from her four overs. She went on to play three matches overall for South Australia that season, taking three wickets.

International career
In December 2022, Wilson was named in the Australia Under-19 squad for the 2023 ICC Under-19 Women's T20 World Cup. She played five matches in the tournament.

References

External links
 
 

2003 births
Living people
People from Mount Barker, South Australia
Australian women cricketers
South Australian Scorpions cricketers